Aida Overton Walker (February 14, 1880 – October 11, 1914), also billed as Ada Overton Walker and as "The Queen of the Cakewalk", was an American vaudeville performer, actress, singer, dancer, choreographer, and wife of vaudevillian George Walker. She appeared with her husband and his performing partner Bert Williams, and in groups such as Black Patti's Troubadours. She was also a solo dancer and choreographer for vaudeville shows such as Bob Cole, Joe Jordan, and J. Rosamond Johnson's The Red Moon (1908) and S. H. Dudley's His Honor the Barber (1911). Aida Overton Walker is also well known for her 1912 performance of the "Salome" dance at Hammerstein's Victoria Theatre.  This was Aida's response to the national "Salomania" craze of 1907 that spread through the white vaudeville circuit.

Biography
Aida Overton was born in New York City, New York on February 14, 1880. She appears as a four-month old infant in the US Census of 1880 with parents Moses age 24 and Pauline age 21. The census indicates her birth place was distinct from that of her parents, who were both born in North Carolina (NC), while Aida's birth place was noted as New York (NY). Moses' occupation was recorded as a waiter. Her name was spelled 'Ada', but this kind of misspelling is common of census records. 

She later gained an education and considerable musical training. At 15, she joined John Isham's "Octoroons," a Black touring group. In the following years she became a chorus member in “Black Patti's Troubadours,” where she eventually met her future husband George Walker, a vaudeville comedian. Her early career was defined by her collaborations with him and his partner Bert Williams, who together soon became the major black vaudeville and musical comedy powerhouses of the era. She and George Walker married on 22 June 1899 when she was 19 years old, and George 26.

Overton Walker first gained national attention in 1900, with her performance of "Miss Hannah from Savannah" in the show Sons of Ham. For the next ten years, she was known primarily for her work in musical theater. Her song and dance made her an instant hit with audiences at the time. She, Walker, and Williams worked together on such musicals as In Dahomey (1903), In Abyssinia (1906), and Bandanna Land (1908). In 1904, after two seasons in England touring with In Dahomey, the group returned to New York. She created a version of the Salome dance, a popular dance routine of the time.

Working alongside her husband, Walker's career and performances were praised by critics. Her successes were well known. She was both financially successful and respected by the industry.

In late 1908, Walker's husband fell ill and the partners closed In Dahomey in 1909. She left the stage for a time to care for her husband.

In 1910, Overton Walker joined the Smart Set Company. During this time she also began touring the vaudeville circuit as a solo act. In 1911, she performed in His Honor the Barber with Smart Set Company. Overton Walker performed as a male character in Lovie Dear, as well as in Bandanna Land, in which she took over her husband's role.

Her husband died in 1911. In 1912, Overton Walker went on tour with her show for 16 weeks, then returned to New York, where she performed as Salome at the Paradise Roof Garden on Broadway. Her success at Hamerstein's theatre led to an invitation to return the following year in Bon Bon Buddy, a musical developed from a song which her husband had popularized in Bandanna Land years before. An ode to her late husband, Overton Walker's performance was so successful she was asked to perform two extra weeks.

Walker died suddenly from kidney failure in 1914. She had continued performing until only two months before her death.

 
In an October 1905 article in The Colored American Magazine, Overton Walker expressed her belief that the performing arts could have an effect on race relations, stating that, "I venture to think and dare to state that our profession does more toward the alleviation of color prejudice than any other profession among colored people."

See also
African-American musical theater

References

Sources
 
 
 Kicha. "Aida Overton Walker (1880 – 1914)". N.p., n.d. 
 
 Manhattan (New York City) marriage records, 1866-1937 ; index to all boroughs, 1866-1937, New York City Municipal Archives, New York. Family History Library microfilm 1504065.
 
 United States Census of 1880, New York City, New York County, New York State; Enumeration District 174; p37

External links

Aida Overton Walker Broke Stereotypes: Victorian Era Stage Aida Overton Walker at Global Performers Database
"Aida Overton Walker: THE LATER YEARS OF AIDA OVERTON WALKER; 1911–1914", Black Acts, archived March 17, 2015. Accessed December 11, 2017. 
"Joe Jordan, with picture of Aida Overton Walker", Jass.com
Obituary in The Freeman, October 17, 1914.
"Aida Overton Walker", Find a Grave database.
Photograph of Aida Overton Walker as Salome  https://digitalcollections.nypl.org/items/8e5e8970-0161-0132-015a-58d385a7bbd0
Medda Larkin, a character in Newsies, who took in newsboys with nowhere to stay, was based on Aida Overton Walker. https://newsboys-of-1899.tumblr.com/post/171559864966/this-is-aida-overton-walker-she-is-the-real-life
Aida Overton Walker Broke Stereotypes: Victorian Era Stage https://racingnelliebly.com/strange_times/aida-overton-walker-broke-stereotypes-of-victorian-era-stage/
 How to Cake Walk, by Aida Overton Walker The Tattler, July 1, 1903 (Syncopated Times reprint)

1880 births
1914 deaths
Vaudeville performers
19th-century American actresses
African-American actresses
20th-century American actresses
American stage actresses
Actresses from Richmond, Virginia
20th-century African-American women
20th-century African-American people